Haeji Kang  (born 14 November 1990) is a South Korean female professional golfer who plays on the LPGA Tour.

Early life and amateur career
Kang was born in Seoul, South Korea. As a child, she moved from Korea to New Zealand and then to Australia to pursue a golf career. She had success as a junior and amateur golfer in Australia. She was the leading amateur in the 2006 LG Bing Lee Women's NSW Open. She won the Australian Girls' Championship in 2007 and finishing in second place up at the Senior Amateur. In 2007, she received a sponsor's invitation to play in the ANZ Ladies Masters where she was the low amateur.

Professional career
Kang participated in the Futures Tour qualifying tournament in the fall of 2007, finishing in 12th place. She turned professional after the qualifying tournament and played 2008 on the Futures Tour. In the 2008 season on the Futures Tour she had six top-10 finishes and one win.

Kang participated in the LPGA qualifying tournament in the fall of 2008 and finished in 29th place which gave her conditional status on the LPGA Tour for 2009 and the ability to continue playing on the Futures Tour. She played in 16 tournaments on the LPGA Tour in 2009, earning enough money to secure full playing privileges on the Tour for 2010. Her best finish in her rookie year of 2009 was a T4 at the Wegmans LPGA. In her second year on the LPGA Tour, 2010, she played a full season of events with a top finish of T5 at the Sybase Match Play Championship.

Professional wins (1)

Futures Tour wins (1)

Results in LPGA majors
Results not in chronological order before 2019.

^ The Evian Championship was added as a major in 2013 

CUT = missed the half-way cut
NT = no tournament
T = tied

Summary

Most consecutive cuts made – 7 (2011 British Open – 2013 U.S. Open)
Longest streak of top-10s – 1

LPGA Tour career summary

 Official as of 2022 season

References

External links

Biography on seoulsisters.com

South Korean female golfers
LPGA Tour golfers
Golfers from Seoul
South Korean emigrants to New Zealand
South Korean emigrants to Australia
1990 births
Living people